= Black Community Services Center =

Stanford University student center

Coordinates: 37.424586°N 122.172647°W

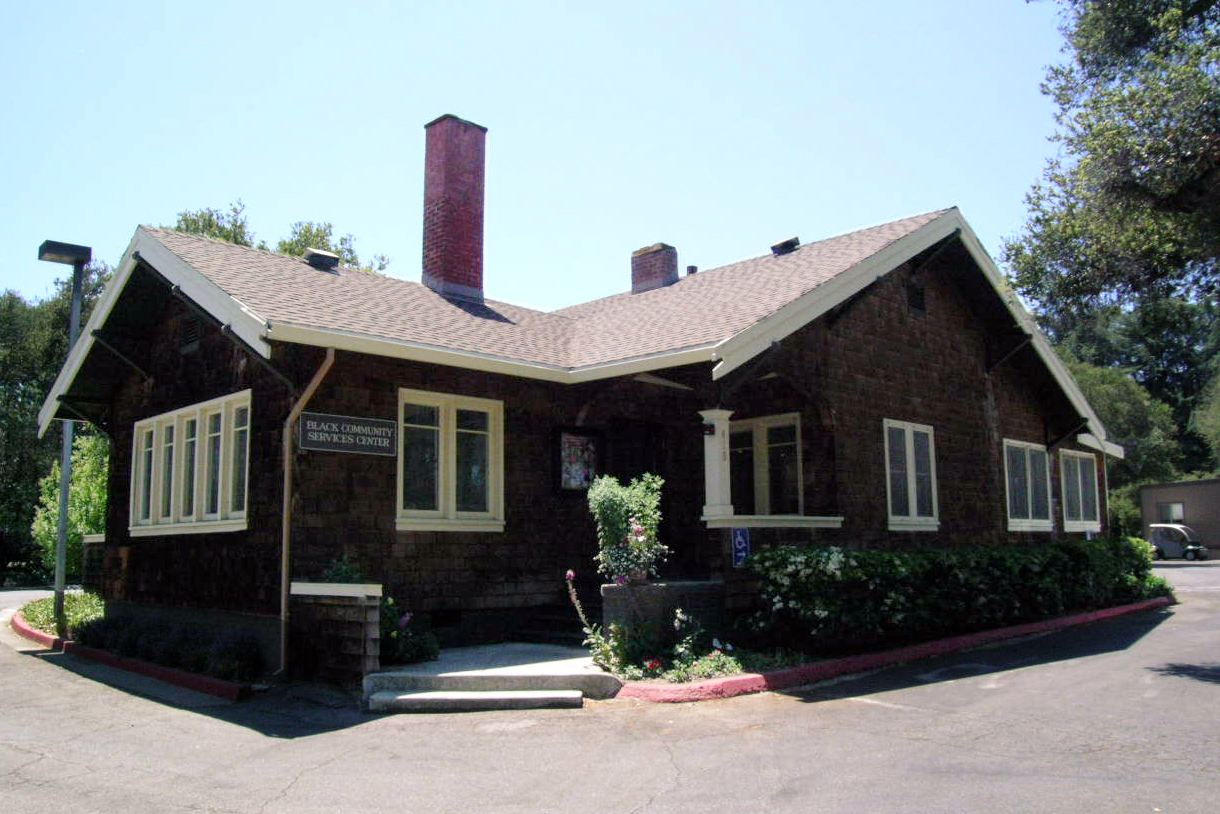
The Black Community Services Center

The Black Community Services Center, originally known as the Black Student Volunteer Center, was established in 1969 in response to a series of Stanford University events resulting from the assassination of Martin Luther King Jr. in April 1968. Since then, the primary goals of the BCSC have changed from being a hub of political activity to a center promoting the personal, intellectual, and professional growth of students in the Black community.

Today, the BSCS offers academic advising programs and mentoring programs. The BCSC also supports more than 35 Black Voluntary Student Organizations (BVSO), and serves as a campus link to the National Black Alumni Association.
